The Child Language Data Exchange System (CHILDES) is a corpus established in 1984 by Brian MacWhinney and Catherine Snow to serve as a central repository for data of first language acquisition. Its earliest transcripts date from the 1960s, and as of 2015 has contents (transcripts, audio, and video) in 26 languages from 230 different corpora, all of which are publicly available worldwide. Recently, CHILDES has been made into a component of the larger corpus TalkBank, which also includes language data from aphasics, second language acquisition, conversation analysis, and classroom language learning.  CHILDES is mainly used for analyzing the language of young children and directed to the child speech of adults.

During the early 1990s, as computational resources capable of easily manipulating the data volumes found in CHILDES became commonly available, there was a significant increase in the number of studies of child language acquisition that made use of it.  CHILDES is currently directed and maintained by Brian MacWhinney at Carnegie Mellon University.

Database Format
There are a variety of languages and ages represented in the CHILDES transcripts.  The majority of the transcripts are from spontaneous interactions and conversations.  The transcriptions are coded in the CHAT (Codes for the Human Analysis of Transcripts) transcription format, which provides a standardized format for producing conversational transcripts. This system can be used to transcribe conversations with any type of language learner: children, second-language learners, and recovering aphasics.  In addition to discourse level transcription, the CHAT system also has options for phonological and morphological analysis.  The CLAN program was developed by Leonid Spektor and aids in transcription and analysis of the child language data.

Use in Research
To date, over 4500 published studies cite CHILDES.  CHILDES reports this number in their manuals  and Google Scholar contains 5451 citations as of July 2017.

References

External links
CHILDES Homepage

Language acquisition
Corpora
Applied linguistics
Linguistic research